Paul West is an Australian chef and TV presenter most well known for River Cottage Australia.

Early life and personal life 

West was born on 27 January 1984 in Murrurundi – a small town in the Hunter Region of New South Wales.

West trained as a chef. He worked at Vue De Monde, as a bistro chef and also met his wife, Alicia, there. They have two children together.

Television work 
His most notable TV work is River Cottage Australia, to which West and Hugh Fearnley-Whittingstall set up a working farm and present recipes based on the farms produce. This is based on the UK Channel 4 series Escape to River Cottage and its Subsequent seasons. Other work includes Back roads Australia and most recently, Catalyst: The Great Australian Bee Challenge for ABC TV (Australia).

River Cottage Australia 

River Cottage Australia is an Australian adaptation of the series. It sees West showcase local produce and farming while attempting to live in a self-sufficient manner. The series premiered in 2013 on The LifeStyle Channel and ran for two seasons before moving to The LifeStyle Channel's sister network LifeStyle Food in 2015.

References 

Australian television presenters
Australian television chefs
1984 births
Living people
People from the Hunter Region